Alfred Curtis may refer to:

 Alfred Schulz-Curtius (c. 1853–1918), or Alfred Curtis, German-British classical music impresario
 Alfred Cyril Curtis (1894–1971), British Indian Army officer